Bruce E. Rittmann is Regents' Professor of Environmental Engineering and Director of the Swette Center for Environmental Biotechnology at the Biodesign Institute of Arizona State University. He was also elected a member of the National Academy of Engineering in 2004 for pioneering the development of biofilm fundamentals and contributing to their widespread use in the cleanup of contaminated waters, soils, and ecosystems.

Biography
Rittmann was born in St. Louis, MO to Albert and Ruth Rittmann. He moved to Affton, MO at age 4 and attended Reavis Elementary School and Affton High School. In 1974, he received the BS degree in Civil Engineering and MS degree in Environmental and Sanitary Engineering from Washington University in St. Louis. After working as an environmental engineer with Sverdrup & Parcel in St. Louis, he moved to Stanford University, where he received the PhD in Environmental Engineering in 1979. His PhD adviser was Perry L. McCarty.

Rittmann joined the faculty in the Department of Civil Engineering at the University of Illinois at Urbana-Champaign in 1980 as an assistant professor. He was promoted to associate and full professor in 1984 and 1988. In 1992, Rittmann moved to Northwestern University to become the John Evans Professor and Area Coordinator of Environmental Engineering. In 2005, he moved to Arizona State University to start the Center for Environmental Biotechnology in the newly formed Biodesign Institute. He was named a Regents’ Professor in 2009, and the Center was endowed as the Swette Center for Environmental Biotechnology in 2011.

Rittmann was the President of the Association of Environmental Engineering and Science Professors in 1990-91, the same organization’s Distinguished Lecture in 2004, chairman of two National Research Council (NRC) committees concerning in situ bioremediation, vice-chairman of the NRC’s Water Science and Technology Board, and Editor-in-Chief of Biodegradation.

Rittmann is married to Marylee MacDonald and the step father of her three children.

Research

Biofilm modeling 

Rittmann is one of the pioneers in developing and applying mathematical models of biofilms, which are microorganisms that grow attached to a solid surface. Although some biofilms are infamous for causing infections or fouling the surfaces of pipes, ships, and membranes, Rittmann focuses on the good biofilms used to treat contaminated water. Mathematical modeling is a powerful tool to integrate the several microbiological, chemical, and transport processes that occur together in a biofilm. Models can represent the gradients in substrates that the microorganisms metabolize, the products generated by the microorganisms, and the different types of microorganisms that exist together in biofilms. Rittmann's PhD dissertation focused on biofilm modeling, and he and his team have expanded the scope and power of biofilm modeling up through today.

Molecular microbial ecology 

Originally working in cooperation with David Stahl, Rittmann introduced the powerful tools of molecular biology to environmental engineering, helping create the exciting field known today as Environmental Biotechnology, in which the goal is to manage microbial communities so that they provide services to society. The tools of molecular microbial ecology directly interrogate the genetic information in microorganisms. They make it possible to determine what types of microorganisms are present in the complex communities of environmental biotechnologies, what reactions those microorganisms can carry out, what reactions they are carrying out, and how they interact with each other and their environment. Now working hand-in-glove with Center colleague Rosa Krajmalnik-Brown, Rittmann is using molecular microbial ecology to understand and manage microbial communities in a wide range of microbiological processes used for removing pollution from water, generating renewable resources, and improving human health.

Microbial products 

Rittmann and several colleagues were the first to define soluble microbial products (SMP), which comprise a wide range of soluble organic molecules that microorganisms release to their environment. With Chrysi Laspidou, Rittmann linked SMP to the solid-phase products generated by microorganisms, the extracellular polymeric substances (EPS); they created the “unified model” of SMP, EPS, and active biomass, and it has been expanded and applied to all types of microbiological processes. Being major sinks for electrons and carbon, SMP and EPS have profound impacts on the performance of environmental biotechnologies in terms of effluent quality and the composition of the biomass.

Bioremediation 

Bioremediation refers to the microorganism-based clean up of contaminated soils and associated water. Rittmann's PhD research involved bioremediation of organic micropollants from wastewater recharge to aquifers. His work expanded to the bioremediation of chlorinated solvents, petroleum hydrocarbons, and radionuclides. Rittmann helped establish and direct the field of in situ bioremediation through the publication of two National Academy reports from committee he chaired: In Situ Bioremediation: When Does it Work? (1993), and Natural Attenuation for Groundwater Remediation (2000).

Membrane biofilm reactors 

Rittmann is the inventor of the Hydrogen-based Membrane Biofilm Reactor (MBfR), which can be used to reduce and detoxify a wide range of oxidized pollutants commonly found in water: e.g., nitrate, perchlorate, chromate, selenate, trichloroethene, and uranyl. In the MBfR, H2 gas is delivered directly to H2-oxidizing bacteria that live on the outer surface of a bubble-less gas-transfer membrane. The oxidized contaminants in the water moving past the biofilm are reduced to harmless or readily removed forms. Rittmann holds six patents on the MBfR, which is commercialized at the ARo (Autotrophic Reduction of) technology by APTwater. The MBfR won the 2011 Environmental Engineering Excellence Award from the American Academy of Environmental Engineers.

Photobioenergy 

Rittmann’s photobioreactor team is working towards finding practical ways to utilize photosynthetic microorganisms to capture sunlight energy and convert CO2 into valuable feedstock for fuels and chemicals. The team focuses on advanced photobioreactor systems that give high productivity of the target product. The product can be part of the biomass itself or chemical synthesized and excreted by the photosynthetic microorganisms. The latter theme is in cooperation with Willem Vermaas of ASU’s School of Life Sciences. The ultimate goal is to make CO2 a resource for generating renewable fuels and chemicals.

Microbial electrochemical cells 

Microbial electrochemistry utilizes bacteria that are able to transfer electrons to the anode of an electrochemical cell.  Called “anode-respiring bacteria,” they are able to oxidize organic molecules and create an electrical current that can be used to generate electrical power, hydrogen gas, hydrogen peroxide, or other reduced materials, depending on conditions at the cathode of the electrochemical cell. Working with Center colleagues César Torres and Sudeep Popat, Rittmann is advancing the fundamental science and technology bases for microbial electrochemistry, with the ultimate goal of using the technology to capture the energy in organic waste streams as valuable energy or chemical outputs.

Intestinal microbial ecology 

The human intestines harbor a very high diversity of microorganisms that interact with the human host in ways that profoundly affect the host’s health. Working with Center colleagues Dr. Rosa Krajmalnik-Brown and Andrew Marcus, Rittmann is helping to uncover the microorganisms that are essential for good health, as well as means to enhance the activity of our “good” bacteria. The team’s work is characterized by its comprehensive nature and orientation towards microbial ecology. The utilize high-throughput genomics, metabolomics, and quantitative modeling to understand the complex interactions among the many microorganisms and the human host, as well as to uncover means to manage the microbial communities towards good health outcomes.

Selected publications

Books

Refereed journal papers 

Complete list

Awards 
 Stockholm Water Prize (2018) for revolutionizing water treatment. 
 ISME/IWA[BR1]  BioCluster Award (2014)
 Joan Hodges Queneau Palladium Medal, American Association of Engineering Societies (AAES) (2014)
 Fellow, Water Environment Federation (WEF) (2013)
 Honorary Member, American Academy of Environmental Engineers and Scientists (AAEES) (2013)
 Distinguished Member, American Society of Civil Engineers (ASCE) (2012)
 Fellow, International Water Association (IWA) (2012)
 Environmental Engineering Excellence Award, American Academy of Environmental Engineers (2011)
 Regents’ Professor, Arizona State University (2009)
 Simon A. Freese Award and Lecture, American Society of Civil Engineers (2009)
 Member, National Academy of Engineering (2004)
 Distinguished Lecturer, Association of Environmental Engineering and Science Professors (2004)
 Fellow, American Association for the Advancement of Sciences (1996)
 A. R. I. Clarke Prize for Outstanding Achievement in Water Science and Technology, National Water Research Institute (1994)
 Walter L. Huber Civil Engineering Research Prize, American Society of Civil Engineers (1990)
 Academic Achievement Award, American Water Works Association; with Jacques 
 University Scholar, University of Illinois (1987)
 Xerox Faculty Research Award, College of Engineering, University of Illinois at Urbana-Champaign (1985)  
 Presidential Young Investigator Award, National Science Foundation (1984)

References 

McKelvey School of Engineering alumni
Stanford University School of Engineering alumni
1950 births
Living people
Environmental engineers
People from Tempe, Arizona
People from St. Louis
Members of the United States National Academy of Engineering
American scientists
Fellows of the Association of Environmental Engineering and Science Professors